The 2002 Trophée des Champions was a football match held at Stade Pierre de Coubertin, Cannes on 27 July 2002, that saw 2001–02 Division 1 champions Olympique Lyonnais defeat 2002 Coupe de France winners FC Lorient 5–1.

Match details

See also
2002–03 Ligue 1

2002–03 in French football
2002
Olympique Lyonnais matches
FC Lorient matches
July 2002 sports events in France
Sport in Cannes